Conus omaria, common name the Omaria cone, is a species of sea snail, a marine gastropod mollusk in the family Conidae, the cone snails and their allies.

Like all species within the genus Conus, these snails are predatory and venomous. They are capable of "stinging" humans, therefore live ones should be handled carefully or not at all.

The variety Conus omaria var. marmoricolor Melvill, 1900 is a synonym of Conus pennaceus Born, 1778.

Description
The shell varies in length between 33 mm and 86 mm. The color of the shell varies from orange-brown to chocolate-color, covered by minute white spots, and overlaid by larger white triangular spots, sometimes forming bands at the shoulder, middle and base.

Distribution
This species occurs in the Central and East Indian Ocean off Aldabra, Madagascar, the Mascarene Basin and Tanzania; off the Philippines and Australia (Northern Territory, Queensland, Western Australia).

References

 Bruguière, M. 1792. Encyclopédie Méthodique ou par ordre de matières. Histoire naturelle des vers. Paris : Panckoucke Vol. 1 i–xviii, 757 pp.
 Reeve, L.A. 1843. Descriptions of new species of shells figured in the 'Conchologia Iconica'. Proceedings of the Zoological Society of London 11: 169–197
 Sowerby, G.B. 1857–1858. Monograph of the genus Conus. 1–56, pls 1–24 in Thesaurus conchyliorum or monographs of genera of shells. London : Sowerby Vol. 3.
 Melvill, J.C. 1900. A revision of textile cones with description of C. cholmondeleyi n. sp. Journal of Conchology 9: 303–311
 Dautzenberg, Ph. (1929). Mollusques testacés marins de Madagascar. Faune des Colonies Francaises, Tome III
 Gillett, K. & McNeill, F. 1959. The Great Barrier Reef and Adjacent Isles: a comprehensive survey for visitor, naturalist and photographer. Sydney : Coral Press 209 pp.
 Wilson, B.R. & Gillett, K. 1971. Australian Shells: illustrating and describing 600 species of marine gastropods found in Australian waters. Sydney : Reed Books 168 pp.
 Hinton, A. 1972. Shells of New Guinea and the Central Indo-Pacific. Milton : Jacaranda Press xviii 94 pp. 
 Cernohorsky, W.O. 1978. Tropical Pacific Marine Shells. Sydney : Pacific Publications 352 pp., 68 pls.
 Motta, A.J. da 1982. Seventeen new cone shell names (Gastropoda: Conidae). Publicaçoes Ocasionais da Sociedade Portuguesa de Malacologia 1: 1–26
 Lauer, J. 1986. A new Cone from the Philippines- Conus viperinus sp. n. La Conchiglia 18(212–213): 8–30, text figs 1–4
 Wilson, B. 1994. Australian Marine Shells. Prosobranch Gastropods. Kallaroo, WA : Odyssey Publishing Vol. 2 370 pp.
 Röckel, D., Korn, W. & Kohn, A.J. 1995. Manual of the Living Conidae. Volume 1: Indo-Pacific Region. Wiesbaden : Hemmen 517 pp.
 Filmer R.M. (2001). A Catalogue of Nomenclature and Taxonomy in the Living Conidae 1758 – 1998. Backhuys Publishers, Leiden. 388pp.
 Tucker J.K. (2009). Recent cone species database. September 4, 2009 Edition
 Puillandre N., Duda T.F., Meyer C., Olivera B.M. & Bouchet P. (2015). One, four or 100 genera? A new classification of the cone snails. Journal of Molluscan Studies. 81: 1–23

Gallery
Below are several color forms:

External links
 The Conus Biodiversity website
 Cone Shells – Knights of the Sea
 
 

omaria
Gastropods described in 1792